Petra (Greek: Πέτρα meaning rock) is a former municipality on the island of Lesbos, North Aegean, Greece. Since the 2019 local government reform it is part of the municipality of West Lesbos, of which it is a municipal unit. It is located at the northwest of Lesbos and comprises the villages Petra, Skoutaros, Stypsi, Lafionas, Ypsilometopo and the settlements Petri and Anaxos.

Geography

The region combines exceptional natural beauties: olive groves and forests with pines, oak-trees, cypress-trees as well as fruit-bearing trees, traditional stone built mountain villages with running waters and rich vegetation, but also seaside modern summer holiday settlements with sandy beaches and crystal waters. Petra Lesvos is beginning to sprawl behind its broad, sandy beach and seafront square with a core of old stone houses, many with Levantine-style balconies overhanging the streets. Petra takes its name from the giant monolith located some distance inland and capped by the eighteenth-century church of Panagia Glykofiloussa, reached via 114 rock-hewn steps on the northeast side. The town of Mithymna is approx. 6 km to the north. The municipality has a land area of 72.479 km² and a population of 3,358 at the 2011 census. Its largest towns are Pétra, the municipal seat (pop. 1,208), Stýpsi (855), and Skoutáros (1,037).

Historical population

See also
List of settlements in Lesbos

References

External links
 Lesvos Calendars

Populated places in Lesbos